Unruh (or Unrug) is a surname. Notable people with the surname include:

 Fritz von Unruh (1885–1970), German dramatist
 Hans Victor von Unruh (1806–1886), Prussian politician
 Howard Unruh (1921–2009), American spree killer
 Jack Unruh (1935–2016), American illustrator
 Jesse M. Unruh (1922–1987), American politician
 Jessica Unruh, American politician
 Józef Unrug (Joseph von Unruh in German; 1884–1973), Polish naval officer
 Leslee Unruh, American activist
 N. U. Unruh (born 1957), German musician
 Otto D. Unruh (1899–1992), American football player and coach
 Paul Unruh (born 1928), American basketball player
 Sigismund von Unruh (1676–1732), Polish-Lithuanian Commonwealth noble and court official
 Trude Unruh (1925–2021), German politician
 William George "Bill" Unruh (born 1945), Canadian physicist

See also 
 24045 Unruh
 Jesse M. Unruh Assembly Fellowship
 Unruh Civil Rights Act
 Unruh effect
 "Unruhe", episode of The X-Files

German-language surnames
Surnames from nicknames
Russian Mennonite surnames
pl:Unrug